José Arturo Castellanos Contreras (23 December 1893 — 18 June 1977) was a Salvadoran army colonel and diplomat who, while working as El Salvador's Consul General for Geneva during World War II, and in conjunction with a Jewish-Romanian businessman named György Mandl, helped save up to 40,000 Central European Jews, most of them from Hungary, from Nazi persecution by providing them with fake Salvadoran citizenship certificates.

Public life and achievements
Colonel Castellanos was born in the provincial city of San Vicente to General Adelino Castellanos and Isabel Contreras de Castellanos. Beginning in 1911, when he entered the Escuela Politécnica Militar (Military Polytechnic School), Coronel Castellanos would spend over 25 active years in the Salvadoran military, eventually achieving the rank of Second Chief of the General Staff of the Army of the Republic. Subsequently he would serve as Salvadoran Consul General in the following locations: Liverpool, England, 1937; Hamburg, Germany, 1938; Geneva, Switzerland, 1942–45.

World War II

Work with György Mandl
It was during his time as consul in neutral Switzerland that Castellanos was approached by a Transylvanian-born Jewish businessman named György Mandl who reiterated to him the grave situation in which he, his family, and countless of his coreligionists found themselves. Castellanos, moved to help Mandl, gave him the ad hoc post of First Secretary to the Consul and had papers of Salvadoran nationality prepared for him and his family. Following a close call with the Gestapo in which the faux position and papers saved the family (who now bore the Italianate name of Mantello) from being sent to Auschwitz, Mandl (with Castellanos's consent) proceeded to secretly issue at least 13,000 "certificates of Salvadoran citizenship" to Central European Jews (principally through the Swiss Consular Office of Carl Lutz). The documents granted the bearers the right to seek and receive the protection of the International Red Cross and, eventually, of the Swiss Consul in Budapest; these guarantees, in effect, saved thousands of "Salvadorans" of Bulgarian, Czechoslovakian, Hungarian, Polish, and Romanian extraction from Nazi depredations.

Work with Jose Gustavo Guerrero

Castellanos received help from another fellow Salvadoran, Jose Gustavo Guerrero, a Salvadoran judge who challenged the Nazis during Hitler's invasion on Europe. The distinguished Salvadoran jurist lived in Europe for many years in his career as a diplomat and as presiding judge of the Permanent Court of Justice International, based in The Hague, The Netherlands.

In 1937, during the rise of Nazism in Europe, Doctor Guerrero took over as president, until he was forced to leave in 1940 by the Nazis. Precisely after the fall of Holland, on May 17, 1940, the Nazis tried to take the Palace of the Permanent Court of Justice in The Hague, but there they met the Salvadoran, the only judge who stayed with a group of Dutch officers. When a German general approached, the Presiding Judge told him: "The Court and its staff are inviolable. Only on my body can they enter the palace." For this and others before courage in defense of Universal Law, Dr. Guerrero was twice nominated for the Nobel Peace Prize.

Once established in Geneva, Dr. Guerrero was visited by the Consul General of El Salvador in Switzerland, Castellanos, who had fled from Germany, where he served as Consul until El Salvador broke relations with the Hitler regime.

Rescue action
Castellanos had already granted several visas to people of Jewish origin who were persecuted by the Nazis. However, now it was part of a larger project: the handing over of false documents of Salvadoran nationality to people of Jewish origin. Castellanos then consulted Dr. Guerrero, who immediately agreed to that plan that saved the lives of thousands of Jews. According to the investigations, Dr. Guerrero would have contributed to writing the text of the document that was then given to them to save their lives.

In 1945 San Francisco, California, a conference was held attended by more than 50 countries and on which the United Nations Organization (UN) was founded.

Late recognition
After the war, Castellanos remained very discreet about his role in the rescue action, considering it to have been nothing out of the ordinary. His daughter, Frieda Castellanos Garcia, only learned about it from the media in 1974, at the age of 22.

The writer Leon Uris tracked down the retired diplomat in 1972 and interviewed him. This attracted the attention of the Salvadoran media, and Castellanos gave another brief radio interview in 1976, but otherwise he remained anonymous and his contribution went unrecognised until well after his death in 1977.

Castellanos' efforts on behalf of the Jews of Central Europe have been recognized at various times by the Anti-Defamation League, the American Jewish Committee, and the group Visas For Life. In 1995 President Bill Clinton, in a letter to the Anti-Defamation League, paid tribute to Colonel Castellanos and other members of the Salvadoran diplomatic corps, for their efforts in saving thousands from Nazi extermination. In 1999 the Jerusalem City Council honored Castellanos' granddaughter, Guadalupe Díaz de Razeghi, on the occasion of the inauguration of El Salvador Street in the neighborhood of Givat Masua.

After the Israeli Foreign Ministry and the Jewish Community of El Salvador have both applied to Israel's Holocaust Martyrs' and Heroes' Remembrance Authority", José Arturo Castellanos Contreras was recognized with the title of "Righteous Among the Nations" by Yad Vashem in 2010.

Colonel Castellanos' grandsons Alvaro Castellanos and Boris Castellanos composed and wrote THE RESCUE - A Live Film-Concerto (An Expanded Cinema Documentary work by Alvaro Castellanos and Boris Castellanos). It is a performative film experience that combines a 60-min documentary film with a live musical performance of its musical soundtrack - to recount the little-known story of Colonel  Castellanos.

Personal life
Castellanos married Maria Schürmann, a native of Switzerland, with whom he had a daughter and two sons: Frieda, Paul Andree, and José Arturo Castellanos Jr.

After the war, Castellanos lived a quiet life and played down his role.

See also
El Salvador during World War II
Geertruida Wijsmuller-Meijer
Per Anger
María Edwards
Varian Fry
Giorgio Perlasca
Eduardo Propper de Callejón
Ángel Sanz Briz
Luiz Martins de Souza Dantas
Aristides de Sousa Mendes
Chiune Sugihara
Raoul Wallenberg
Jan Zwartendijk
History of the Jews in the Dominican Republic
History of the Jews in El Salvador

References

Braham, Randolph L., The Nazis' last victims: the Holocaust in Hungary. Detroit; [Great Britain]: Wayne State University Press, 1998.
Kranzler, David, The man who stopped the trains to Auschwitz : George Mantello, El Salvador, and Switzerland's finest hour. Syracuse, N.Y.: Syracuse University Press, 2000.

External links
  El Salvador a Rescuing Country; Raoul Wallenberg Foundation
Glass House: the story of El Salvador's World War II rescue operations
 Héroe del Holocausto {es}
 José Castellanos Contreras – Holocaust Heroes Budapest
 https://www.castellanosmovie.com/

1893 births
1977 deaths
People from San Vicente, El Salvador
Jewish Hungarian history
Salvadoran diplomats
Salvadoran human rights activists
Salvadoran military personnel
Salvadoran Righteous Among the Nations
People who rescued Jews during the Holocaust